The 2011–12 East Superleague (known as the ACA Sports East Superleague for sponsorship reasons) was the 11th season of the East Superleague, the top tier of league competition for SJFA East Region member clubs.

The season began on 27 August 2011 and ended on 26 May 2012. Bo'ness United were the reigning champions.

Only the bottom placed side was relegated to the East Premier League after Forfar West End were unable to guarantee fulfilment of their fixtures and withdrew from the league on 18 October 2011.

Bonnyrigg Rose Athletic won the championship on the final day of the season. As champions they entered the First Round of the 2012–13 Scottish Cup. Founder members Bathgate Thistle were relegated from the Superleague for the first time.

Teams

To East Superleague
Promoted from East Premier League
St Andrews United
Carnoustie Panmure

From East Superleague
Relegated to East Premier League
Newtongrange Star
Tayport

Stadia and locations

Managerial changes

League table

Results

References

6
East Superleague seasons